Yves Ternon (born 1932 in Saint-Mandé) is a French physician and medical historian, as well as an author of historical books about the Jewish Holocaust and the Armenian genocide. He is professor of the history of medicine at University Paris IV Sorbonne. He is also an active member of Doctors Without Borders organization.

Books
 Histoire de la médecine SS (with Socrate Helman), Paris, Casterman, 1969
 Le Massacre des aliénés (with Socrate Helman), Paris, Casterman, 1971
 Les médecins allemands et le national-socialisme (with Socrate Helman), Paris, Casterman, 1973
 Les Arméniens. Histoire d'un génocide, Paris, Seuil, 1977 and 1996
 La Cause Arménienne, Paris, Seuil, 1983
 1917-1921, Makhno, Brussels, Complexe, 1987.
 Enquête sur la négation d'un génocide, Marseilles, Parenthèses, 1989
 Raspoutine, une tragédie russe, Brussels, Complexe, 1991 and Brussels, André Versaille, 2011 
 L’État criminel. Les génocides au XXe siècle, Paris, Seuil, 1995.
 Du négationnisme. Mémoire et tabou, Paris, Desclée de Brouwer, 1999
 L’innocence des victimes : regard sur les génocides du XXe siècle, Paris, Desclée de Brouwer, 2001.
 Empire ottoman. Le déclin, la chute, l’effacement, Paris, Éditions du Félin et Éditions Michel de Maule, 2002
 1915, le génocide des Arméniens (with Gérard Chaliand), Brusells, Complexe, 2006 (5e édition revue et augmentée)
 Éclats de Voix. Recueils de textes 1974-2005, Paris, Éditions du félin (Poche), 2006
 Mardin 1915: Anatomie pathologique d’une destruction, Paris, Librairie orientaliste Paul Geuthner, 2007   
 Guerres et génocides au XXe siècle, Paris, Odile Jacob, 2007
 7, rue de Chelles - Pour ce que nous avons tous été enfants..., Paris, Éditions du félin, 2009.

External links
Article for Le Monde 
Biography 
Biography 

20th-century French historians
21st-century French historians
Historians of the Armenian genocide
Historians of the Holocaust
Academic staff of the University of Paris
French surgeons
French medical writers
People from Saint-Mandé
1932 births
Living people